In mathematics, a  fibrifold is (roughly) a fiber space whose fibers and base spaces are orbifolds.

Irreducible cubic space groups 

The 35 irreducible space groups correspond to the cubic space group.

Irreducible group symbols (indexed 195−230) in Hermann–Mauguin notation, Fibrifold notation, geometric notation, and Coxeter notation:

References

Symmetry
Finite groups
Discrete groups